Ōkurayama Station may refer to:
Ōkurayama Station (Kanagawa) - (大倉山駅) A station in Kanagawa Prefecture, Japan, served by Tokyu Toyoko Line
Ōkurayama Station (Hyōgo) - (大倉山駅) A station in Hyogo Prefecture, Japan, served by Kobe Municipal Subway Seishin-Yamate Line